Olav "Ole" Bernt Kollevoll (January 7, 1923 – September 11, 2010) was an American ice hockey, baseball and football player and coach.

Career
Born in Kristiansand, Norway, Kollevoll emigrated to the United States with his parents and grew up in Brooklyn. Kollevoll began attending Colgate University in the fall of 1941, playing ice hockey, baseball, and football in his time there. He was an initiate of Delta Upsilon. After graduating from an accelerated program in 1945 Kollevoll joined the United States Navy towards the end of World War II. After his tour was over he began a short professional career in both baseball and hockey before retiring following an injury in 1948.

Kollevoll became the head coach at St. Lawrence in 1950 for both the baseball and hockey squads. During his time there he attained his master's degree while leading the Saints to their first two appearances in the NCAA Division I Men's Ice Hockey Championship. In 1955 Kollevoll returned to his alma mater, taking over as head coach for the ice hockey and freshman football clubs. In 1957 Colgate's hockey program returned to varsity status and became a founding member of ECAC Hockey four years later.

Kollevoll left Colgate in 1965 to become the athletic director at Lafayette College, remaining there until his retirement in 1989. He died on September 11, 2010.

Head coaching record

References:

References

External links
 

1923 births
2010 deaths
American men's ice hockey defensemen
Colgate Raiders football coaches
Colgate Raiders football players
Colgate Raiders baseball players
Colgate Raiders men's ice hockey players
Colgate Raiders men's ice hockey coaches
Evansville Braves players
Hartford Chiefs players
Jackson Senators players
Lafayette Leopards athletic directors
Ogdensburg Maples players
St. Lawrence Saints baseball coaches
St. Lawrence Saints men's ice hockey coaches
United States Navy personnel of World War II
Sportspeople from Brooklyn
Baseball players from New York City
Players of American football from New York City
Sportspeople from Kristiansand
Ice hockey coaches from New York (state)
Norwegian ice hockey people
Norwegian emigrants to the United States
Ice hockey players from New York (state)
Military personnel from New York City